The Alte Feuerwache is a music venue and former fire station located in Mannheim, Germany. Opened in 1912 as a fire station, it was converted into a music venue in the early 1990s. Alte Feuerwache has hosted artists such as Dio, Motörhead and Arctic Monkeys.

References

External links
 

Music venues in Germany
Buildings and structures completed in 1912
1912 establishments in Germany

de:Alte Feuerwache (Mannheim)